John Braban (died c. 1443) was the member of Parliament for the constituency of Dover for multiple parliaments from October 1416 to 1435.

References 

Members of the Parliament of England for Dover
Year of birth unknown
1440s deaths
Year of death unknown
English MPs October 1416
English MPs 1417
English MPs 1419
English MPs May 1421
English MPs December 1421
English MPs 1422
English MPs 1423
English MPs 1431
English MPs 1435